Juliana's, also known as Juliana's Tokyo (ジュリアナ東京), was a Japanese discothèque that operated in Shibaura, Minato, Tokyo from May 15, 1991 till August 31, 1994.  It was famous for its dance platforms, on which office ladies dressed in "bodycon" clubwear would congregate, as amateur go-go dancers (professionals were also employed).  The club was produced by Masahiro Origuchi for the British leisure services group Juliana's (then part of Wembley PLC), and Nissho Iwai Corporation, the Japanese general trading company (now part of Sojitz).

Musical style and legacy 

Juliana's started out playing Italo house then quickly following popular trends to Hardcore techno. The Juliana's producers published a series of compilation CDs which were popularizing techno in Japan. The album sales were an essential part of the business concept as the club was never very profitable on its own.

Cultural impact 

The Juliana culture represented a hedonistic youth culture which had only recently arrived in Japan. The gyaru subculture found its expression in high school girls and office ladies alike transforming into Juliana girls in the evening, whereas men often came to the club in business suits.

References 

The club Juliana's is mentioned several times in the shōjo manga Hana Yori Dango by Yoko Kamio (神尾 葉子).

Earthquake Bird movie has club scenes heavily influenced by Juliana's and bodycon fashion styles.

See also 
 Herve Leger—the fashion house founded by the creator of the body-con dress

Notes

References 

 Associated Press. "Juliana's craze ceases", September 1, 1994. Accessed 2 July 2017.
 Brand, Jude.  Tokyo Night City. Rutland, Vermont: Charles E. Tuttle Company, 1993. .
 Kawakami, Sumie. "Survivors: two approaches to survival in Japan's unkind economy: meet the fighter and the surfer - H.I.S. president Hideo Sawada and Goodwill Group CEO Masahiro Origuchi". Japan, Inc., December 2002. Accessed 10 August 2008.
 Schilling, Mark.  "Juliana's" in The Encyclopedia of Japanese Pop Culture. New York: Weatherhill, 1997. .
 Sterngold, James. "A Night on the Town in Tokyo".  The New York Times, October 18, 1992. Accessed 2 July 2017.
 Trends in Japan. "Disco Icon Sets Out To Conquer Nursing Care: Former Club Producer Ventures Into New Territory", June 30, 2000. Accessed 10 August 2008.

Dance venues
Nightclubs in Japan
Heisei period
Sojitz